The Allied administration of Libya was the control of the ex-Italian colony of Italian Libya by the Allies from 13 May 1943 until Libyan independence was granted in 1951. It was divided into two parts:
British Military Administration of Libya (UN administration after 1949)
French Military Territory of Fezzan-Ghadames (UN administration after 1949)

Characteristics
The Allied administration was administered by the United Kingdom in Tripolitania and Cyrenaica, and by France in Fezzan. Officially Libya remained "Italian Libya" until February 1947, when Italy signed the Peace Treaty ceding all the colonies and possessions of the defeated former Italian Empire.

The British administered it as the British Military Administration of Libya. The French forces occupied the area that was the former Italian Territorio Sahara Libico and made several requests to administratively annex Fezzan to the French colonial Empire. The administrative personnel remained the former Italian bureaucrats.

History

In November 1942, the Allied forces retook Cyrenaica. By February 1943, the last German and Italian soldiers were driven from Libya and the Allied occupation of Libya began.

In the early post-war period, Tripolitania and Cyrenaica remained under British administration, while the French controlled Fezzan. In 1944, Idris returned from exile in Cairo but declined to resume permanent residence in Cyrenaica until the removal in 1947 of some aspects of foreign control. Under the terms of the 1947 peace treaty with the Allies, Italy, which hoped to maintain the colony of Tripolitania, (and France, which wanted the Fezzan), relinquished all claims to Libya. Libya so remained united.

Severe anti-Jewish violence erupted in Libya following the liberation of North Africa by Allied troops. From 5–7 November 1945, more than 140 Jews (including 36 children) were killed and hundreds injured in a pogrom in Tripoli. Five synagogues in Tripoli and four in provincial towns were destroyed, and over 1,000 Jewish residences and commercial buildings were plundered in Tripoli alone.

In June 1948, anti-Jewish rioters in Libya killed another 12 Jews and destroyed 280 Jewish homes. The fear and insecurity which arose from these anti-Jewish attacks and the founding of the state of Israel led many Jews to flee Libya. From 1948 to 1951, 30,972 Libyan Jews moved to Israel. By the 1970s, the rest of Libyan Jews (some 7,000) were evacuated to Italy.

Idris as-Senussi, the Emir of Tripolitania and Cyrenaica and the leader of the Senussi Muslim Sufi order, represented Libya in the UN negotiations, and on 24 December 1951, Libya declared its independence with representatives from Cyrenaica, Tripolitania and Fezzan declaring a union with the country being called the United Kingdom of Libya, and Idris as-Senussi being offered the crown. In accordance with the constitution the new country had a federal government with the three states of Cyrenaica, Tripolitania and Fezzan having autonomy. The kingdom also had three capital cities: Tripoli, Benghazi and Bayda. Two years after independence, on 28 March 1953, Libya joined the Arab League.

When Libya declared its independence on 24 December 1951, ending the Allied occupation of Libya, it was the first country to achieve independence through the United Nations and one of the first former European possessions in Africa to gain independence.

See also
 Italian Libya
 1945 Tripoli pogrom
 1948 Tripoli pogrom
 Kingdom of Libya

References

20th century in Libya
Aftermath of World War II
Italy–Libya relations
Libya
Military occupation